The BBC Proms or Proms, formally named the Henry Wood Promenade Concerts Presented by the BBC, is an eight-week summer season of daily orchestral classical music concerts and other events held annually, predominantly in the Royal Albert Hall in central London. The Proms were founded in 1895, and are now organised and broadcast by the BBC. Each season consists of concerts in the Royal Albert Hall, chamber music concerts at Cadogan Hall, additional Proms in the Park events across the UK on the Last Night of the Proms, and associated educational and children's events.  The season is a significant event in British culture and in classical music. Czech conductor Jiří Bělohlávek described the Proms as "the world's largest and most democratic musical festival".

Prom is short for promenade concert, a term which originally referred to outdoor concerts in London's pleasure gardens, where the audience was free to stroll around while the orchestra was playing. In the context of the BBC Proms, promming refers to the use of the standing areas inside the hall (the Arena and Gallery) for which ticket prices are much lower than for the seating.  Proms concert-goers, particularly those who stand, are sometimes referred to as "Prommers" or "Promenaders".

History

Origins and Sir Henry Wood
Promenade concerts had existed in London's pleasure gardens since the mid-18th century, and indoor proms became a feature of 19th century musical life in London from 1838, notably under the direction of Louis Antoine Jullien and Sir Arthur Sullivan. The annual series of Proms continuing today had their roots in that movement. They were inaugurated on 10 August 1895 in the Queen's Hall in Langham Place by the impresario Robert Newman, who was fully experienced in running similar concerts at His Majesty's Theatre. Newman wished to generate a wider audience for concert hall music by offering low ticket prices and an informal atmosphere, where eating, drinking and smoking were permitted to the promenaders. He stated his aim to Henry Wood in 1894 as follows:

George Cathcart, an otolaryngologist, gave financial backing to Newman for the series (called "Mr Robert Newman's Promenade Concerts") on condition that Henry Wood be employed as the sole conductor. Wood, aged 26, seized this opportunity and built the "Queen's Hall Orchestra" as the ensemble specially devoted to performing the promenade concerts. Cathcart also stipulated (contrary to Newman's preference) the adoption of French or Open Diapason concert pitch, necessitating the acquisition of an entirely new set of wind instruments for the orchestra, and the re-tuning of the Queen's Hall organ. This coincided with the adoption of this lower pitch by other leading orchestras and concert series. Although the concerts gained a popular following and reputation, Newman went bankrupt in 1902, and the banker Edgar Speyer took over the expense of funding them. Wood received a knighthood in 1911. In 1914 anti-German feeling led Speyer to surrender his role, and music publishers Chappell & Co. took control of the concerts.

Although Newman remained involved in artistic planning, it was Wood's name which became most closely associated with the Proms. As conductor from the first concert (which opened with Wagner's Rienzi overture) in 1895, Sir Henry was largely responsible for building the repertoire heard as the series continued from year to year. While including many popular and less demanding works, in the first season there were substantial nights devoted to Beethoven or Schubert, and a programme of new works was given in the final week. Distinguished singers including Sims Reeves and Signor Foli appeared. In the first two decades Wood firmly established the policy of introducing works by contemporary composers (both British and international) and of bringing fresh life to unperformed or under-performed works. A bronze bust of Sir Henry Wood recovered from the ruins of the bombed-out Queen's Hall in 1941, and now belonging to the Royal Academy of Music, is still placed in front of the organ for the whole Promenade season. Though the concerts are now called the BBC Proms, and are headlined with the BBC logo, the tickets are subtitled "BBC Music presents the Henry Wood Promenade Concerts".

In 1927, following Newman's sudden death in the previous year, the BBC – later based at Broadcasting House next to the hall – took over the running of the concerts. This arose because William Boosey, then managing director of Chappell & Co. (the Prom. proprietors), detested broadcasting and saw the BBC's far-reaching demands and intentions in the control of musical presentation as a danger to the future of public concerts altogether. He decided to disband the New Queen's Hall Orchestra, which played for the last time at a Symphony concert on 19 March 1927. He found it more expedient to let the Queen's Hall to the broadcasting powers, rather than to continue the Promenade concerts and other big series independently in an unequal competition with what was effectively the Government itself. So the Proms were saved, but under a different kind of authority. The personnel of the New Queen's Hall Orchestra effectively continued until 1930 as "Sir Henry J. Wood and his Symphony Orchestra". When the BBC Symphony Orchestra (BBC SO) was formed in 1930, it became the main orchestra for the concerts. At this time the season consisted of nights dedicated to particular composers; Mondays were Wagner, Fridays were Beethoven, with other major composers being featured on other days. There were no Sunday performances.

During World War II

With the outbreak of World War II in 1939, the BBC withdrew its support. However private sponsors stepped in to maintain the Proms, always under Sir Henry Wood's direction, until the Queen's Hall was devastated beyond repair during an air raid in May 1941. (The site is now occupied by the St George's Hotel and BBC Henry Wood House). The concerts then moved (until 1944) to their current home, the Royal Albert Hall, during the Promenade season presented by Keith Douglas in conjunction with the Royal Philharmonic Society (of which he was Secretary).

The London Symphony Orchestra had sometimes assisted in the series since (after 1927) the New Queen's Hall Orchestra had ceased to function, and in 1942 Sir Henry Wood also invited the London Philharmonic Orchestra under its new leader Jean Pougnet to participate in this and subsequent seasons. In this he was attempting to maintain vigour in the programme, under the renewal of its relationship with the BBC as promoters. Sir Henry Wood continued his work with the Proms through vicissitudes with the BBC until his death in 1944, the year of his Jubilee Season. During that period Sir Adrian Boult, chief conductor of the BBC Symphony Orchestra, and Basil Cameron also took on conducting duties for the series, continuing them in 1944 when, under increased danger from bombing, they were moved again, this time to the Bedford Corn Exchange (home of the BBC Symphony Orchestra since 1941) which hosted them until the end of the War.

Post-war
Sir Adrian Boult and Basil Cameron continued as conductors of the Promenade Concerts after the War, on their return to the Royal Albert Hall, until the advent of Malcolm Sargent as Proms chief conductor in 1947. Sargent held this post until 1966; his associate conductor from 1949 to 1959 was John Hollingsworth. Sargent was noted for his immaculate appearance (evening dress, carnation) and his witty addresses where he good-naturedly chided the noisy Prommers. Sir Malcolm championed choral music and classical and British composers, especially Samuel Coleridge-Taylor. The charity founded in his name, CLIC Sargent, continues to hold a special Promenade Concert each year shortly after the main season ends. CLIC Sargent, the Musicians' Benevolent Fund and further musical charities (chosen each year) also benefit from thousands of pounds in donations from Prommers after most concerts.  When asking for donations, Prommers from the Arena regularly announce to the audience the running donations total at concert intervals through the season, or before the concert when there is no interval.

After Wood's death, Julian Herbage acted as de facto principal administrator of the Proms for a number of years, as a freelance employee after his retirement from the BBC, with assistance from such staff as Edward Clark and Kenneth Wright. During the tenure of William Glock as Controller of the Proms, from 1960 to 1973, the Proms repertory expanded both forwards in time, to encompass then contemporary and avant-garde composers such as Boulez, Berio, Carter, Dallapiccola, Peter Maxwell Davies, Gerhard, Henze, Ligeti, Lutosławski, Lutyens, Maw, Messiaen, Nono, Stockhausen, and Tippett, as well as backwards to include music by past composers such as Purcell, Cavalli, Monteverdi, Byrd, Palestrina, Dufay, Dunstaple, and Machaut, as well as less-often performed works of Johann Sebastian Bach and Joseph Haydn. From the 1960s, the number of guest orchestras at the Proms also began to increase, with the first major international conductors (Leopold Stokowski, Georg Solti, and Carlo Maria Giulini) performing in 1963, and the first foreign orchestra, the Moscow Radio Symphony Orchestra, performing in 1966. Since that time, almost every major international orchestra, conductor and soloist has performed at the Proms. In 1970, Soft Machine's appearance led to press attention and comment as the first "pop" band to perform there.

The 1968 season began on a Friday night instead of the usual Saturday night. This concert marked a tribute to Sir Malcolm Sargent who had died shortly after delivering a brief speech from the rostrum at the Last Night in 1967. He had been too ill to actually conduct that concert.  Every year since then, the Proms have always started on a Friday night in July.

Since 1990
The Proms continue today, and still present newly commissioned music alongside pieces more central to the repertoire and early music. Innovations continue, with pre-Prom talks, lunchtime chamber concerts, children's Proms, Proms in the Park either appearing, or being featured more heavily over the past few years. In the UK, all concerts are broadcast on BBC Radio 3, an increasing number are televised on BBC Four with some also shown on BBC One and BBC Two. The theme tune that used to be played at the beginning of each programme broadcast on television (until the 2011 season) was an extract from the end of the "Red" movement of Arthur Bliss's A Colour Symphony. It is also possible to hear the concerts live from the BBC Proms website. The Last Night is also broadcast in many countries around the world.

In 1996, a related series of eight lunchtime chamber concerts was started, taking place on Mondays during the Proms season. In their first year these were held in the Britten Hall of the Royal College of Music (just across Prince Consort Road from the Albert Hall). The following year they moved slightly further afield, to the Henry Cole Lecture Theatre at the Victoria and Albert Museum. In 2005, they moved further again, to the new Cadogan Hall, just off London's Sloane Square. These allow the Proms to include music which is not suitable for the vast spaces of the Albert Hall.

From 1998 to 2007, the Blue Peter Prom, in partnership with long-running BBC television programme Blue Peter, was an annual fixture. Aimed at children and families, the Prom is informal, including audience participation, jokes, and popular classics. High demand for tickets – which are among the lowest priced in the season – saw this Prom be split in 2004 into two Proms with identical content. In 2008, the Blue Peter Prom was replaced with a Doctor Who Prom which was revived in both the 2010 and 2013 seasons.

The 2004 season also featured the Hall's newly rebuilt pipe organ. It took two years to complete the task (2002–2004) and was the work of Noel Mander, Ltd., of London. It was the first complete restoration of the instrument since Harrison and Harrison's work in 1936.

The tradition of Promming remains an important aspect of the festival, with over 1000 standing places available for each concert, either in the central arena (rather like the groundlings in the pit at Shakespeare's Globe) or high in the hall's gallery. Promming tickets cost the same for all concerts (currently £6 as of 2018), providing a considerably cheaper option for the more popular events. Since the tickets cannot be bought until 9am on the morning of the concert (although there are full-season tickets, first weekend and weekly passes available), they provide a way of attending otherwise sold-out concerts.

In 2010, the Proms Archive was introduced on the BBC Proms webpage, to allow for a systematic searching of all works that have been performed and all artists who have appeared at the Proms since their inception. On 1 September 2011, a Prom given by the Israel Philharmonic Orchestra was severely affected by interruptions from pro-Palestinian protesters. While the Palestine Solidarity Campaign had urged a boycott, they denied being behind the disruption inside the Royal Albert Hall. For the first time ever, the BBC took a Prom concert off the air.

Successive Controllers of the Proms after Glock have been Robert Ponsonby (1973–1985), John Drummond (1986–1995), Nicholas Kenyon (1996–2007), and Roger Wright (2007–2014). Between 1986 and 2014, the post of Director, BBC Proms had mostly been combined with the role of Controller, BBC Radio 3.

Edward Blakeman, editor of BBC Radio 3, became interim Proms Director upon Wright's departure in July 2014.  In May 2015, the BBC announced the appointment of David Pickard as the next Director of BBC Proms.

Proms seasons

2006 
The 2006 season (the 112th) marked the 250th birthday celebrations of Mozart and the centenary of Shostakovich's birth. New initiatives included four Saturday matinee concerts at the Cadogan Hall and the chance for audience members to get involved with The Voice, a collaborative piece performed in two Proms on 29 July. On 3 September 2006, a concert was cancelled due to a fire. The season saw the launch of a venture called the Proms Family Orchestra in which children and their extended families can make music with BBC musicians.

2007 
The 2007 season ran from 13 July to 8 September. Early press coverage focused heavily on the fact that musical theatre star Michael Ball would be the central performer in a concert on 27 August and a concert of British film music on 14 July. This led to media accusations of "dumbing down", despite Kenyon's defence of the programme. Anniversaries marked in this Proms season included:
 The 150th anniversary of the birth of Sir Edward Elgar
 The 100th anniversary of the death of Edvard Grieg
 The 50th anniversary of the death of Jean Sibelius
 80 years since the first BBC sponsorship of the Proms.

The series also included an additional series of four Saturday matinee concerts at Cadogan Hall.  The 2007 season was Kenyon's last season as controller of the BBC Proms, before he became managing director at the Barbican Centre. Roger Wright became Controller of the Proms in October 2007, whilst retaining responsibility for BBC Radio 3 and taking up a broader role controlling the BBC's classical music output across all media.

2008 
The 2008 season ran from 18 July to 13 September 2008. The BBC released details of the season slightly earlier than usual, on 9 April 2008. Composers whose anniversaries were marked include:
 Ralph Vaughan Williams:  50th anniversary of his death
 Elliott Carter: 100th birthday
 Olivier Messiaen: 100th anniversary of his birth
 Nikolai Rimsky-Korsakov:  centenary of his death
 Karlheinz Stockhausen: 80th anniversary of his birth
The celebration of Stockhausen was centred on two large-scale concerts on 2 August 2008, and complementing Vaughan Williams's interest in folk music, the first Sunday was given over to a celebration of various aspects of British folk, including free events in Kensington Gardens and the Albert Hall, and ending with the first-ever Proms céilidh in the Albert Hall itself.

Other changes included additional pre-Prom talks and events.  For the first time, there was a related talk or event before every Prom, held in the Royal College of Music.  The popular family-oriented Prom this year became the Doctor Who Prom, (in place of the Blue Peter Prom of recent years). The Doctor Who Prom included a mini-episode of Doctor Who, "Music of the Spheres".

Just over a month before the announcement of the season, Margaret Hodge, a Minister of State at the Department for Culture, Media and Sport suggested "that the Proms was one of several big cultural events that many people did not feel comfortable attending" and advocated an increase in multicultural works and an effort to broaden the audience. Her comments received wide criticism in the musical world and media as being a fundamental misunderstanding of the nature of the Proms, with the then UK prime minister Gordon Brown even distancing himself from her remarks.

2009 
In the 2009 season, which ran from 17 July to 12 September 2009, the total number of concerts reached 100 for the first time.  The principal anniversary composers included:
 George Frideric Handel (250th anniversary of his death)
 Joseph Haydn (200th anniversary of his death)
 Felix Mendelssohn (200th anniversary of his birth)
 Henry Purcell (350th anniversary of his birth)
Other composer anniversaries noted in the 2009 Proms included:

 Louis Andriessen (70th birthday)
 Harrison Birtwistle (75th birthday)
 John Casken (60th birthday)
 George Crumb (80th birthday)
 Frederick Delius (75th anniversary of his death)
 Edward Elgar (75th anniversary of his death)
 Jonathan Harvey (70th birthday)
 Gustav Holst (75th anniversary of his death)
 Albert Ketèlbey (50th anniversary of his death)
 Bohuslav Martinů (50th anniversary of his death)
 Peter Maxwell Davies (75th birthday)
 Heitor Villa-Lobos (50th anniversary of his death)

The humorist and music impresario Gerard Hoffnung was also remembered with the performance in the Last Night of Malcolm Arnold's A Grand Grand Overture, which was commissioned for the first Hoffnung Music Festival. The 2009 Proms featured Bollywood music for the first time, as part of a day-long series of concerts and events also covering Indian classical music. Performers in the day included Ram Narayan, Rajan and Sajan Mishra, and Shaan. Noted historical anniversaries covered in the 2009 Proms included the 75th anniversary of the MGM film musical, and the 10th year of the West-Eastern Divan Orchestra.
There was a child-oriented Prom to mark the Darwin bicentenary as well as a Free Family Prom including the Proms Family Orchestra. There was also a concert performance by the Ukulele Orchestra of Great Britain which was broadcast live on BBC Radio 3 and received critical acclaim. This concert included a version of Beethoven's Ode to Joy in which at least 1000 audience members participated with Ukuleles.

2010 

The 2010 Proms season ran from 16 July to 11 September. The principal anniversary composers included:
 Frédéric Chopin (200th anniversary of his birth)
 Gustav Mahler (150th anniversary of his birth)
 Robert Schumann (200th anniversary of his birth)
 Stephen Sondheim (80th birthday)
 Arvo Pärt (75th birthday)
 Rodgers and Hammerstein (50th anniversary of the death of Oscar Hammerstein II)
Other anniversaries of composers featured at the Proms included:
 Thomas Arne (300th anniversary of his birth)
 Wilhelm Friedemann Bach (300th anniversary of his birth)
 Samuel Barber (100th anniversary of his birth)
 Alban Berg (125th anniversary of his birth)
 George Benjamin (50th birthday)
 James Dillon (60th birthday)
 Bayan Northcott (70th birthday)
 Gunther Schuller (85th birthday)
 Mark-Anthony Turnage (50th birthday)
 Hugo Wolf (150th anniversary of his birth)
In addition, Hubert Parry and Alexander Scriabin received particular focus. One day was dedicated particularly to Sir Henry Wood, including a recreation of the 1910 Last Night. For families, the Doctor Who Prom, first introduced in 2008, received new renditions hosted by the newest Doctor (Matt Smith) and his companions Amy Pond (Karen Gillan) and Rory Williams (Arthur Darvill). The booking system was also revised with a new online system to allow ticket buyers to set up a personalised Proms plan in advance to speed up the booking process.

2011 
The 2011 Proms season began on 15 July 2011 and ran until 10 September 2011.  The principal anniversary composers included:
 Percy Grainger (50th anniversary of his death)
 Franz Liszt (200th anniversary of his birth; 125th anniversary of his death)
 Gustav Mahler (100th anniversary of his death)
 Tomás Luis de Victoria (400th anniversary of his death)
Other anniversaries of composers featured at the Proms included:
 Richard Rodney Bennett (75th birthday)
 Marc-André Dalbavie (50th birthday)
 Marcel Dupré (125th anniversary of his birth)
 Henri Dutilleux (95th birthday)
 Sofia Gubaidulina (80th birthday)
 Bernard Herrmann (100th anniversary of his birth)
 Stan Kenton (100th anniversary of his birth)
 Colin Matthews (65th birthday)
 Steve Reich (75th birthday)

The music of Frank Bridge also received a particular non-anniversary-related focus.  Other notable performances included the first Proms performance of Havergal Brian's Symphony No. 1 ('The Gothic'), which was also the 6th live performance ever, and subsequently released on a Hyperion commercial recording. The 2011 Proms season also featured new works by Sally Beamish, Harrison Birtwistle, Peter Maxwell Davies, Pascal Dusapin, Graham Fitkin, Thomas Larcher, Kevin Volans, Judith Weir, and Stevie Wishart.

Prom 62, featuring the Israel Philharmonic Orchestra on 1 September 2011, was taken off air by the BBC following vocal anti-Israeli protests from some members of the audience.  This was the first time that the BBC had taken a Proms concert off air mid-broadcast.

The 2011 Proms also featured the first ever 'Comedy Prom' hosted by comedian and pianist Tim Minchin, as well as the debut of the Spaghetti Western Orchestra. No other 'Comedy Prom' has taken place to date.

The children's prom of 2011 was based on the CBBC television series Horrible Histories and featured a number of songs from the show.

2012 
The 2012 Proms was the 118th season, began on 13 July 2012 and ran until 8 September 2012.  Notable aspects of the season included the first Beethoven symphony cycle by a single orchestra at the Proms since 1942, with Daniel Barenboim conducting the West-Eastern Divan Orchestra, and various works and concerts that highlighted the 2012 London Olympic Games.  Composer anniversaries included:
 John Adams: 65th birthday
 John Cage: centenary
 Hugh Wood: 80th birthday
The season also noted the 70th anniversary of the BBC programme Desert Island Discs.

2013 
The 2013 season celebrated several composer anniversaries:
 Benjamin Britten: centenary
 Giuseppe Verdi: bicentenary
 Richard Wagner: bicentenary
The season featured concert performances of seven of Wagner's thirteen operas, including Der Ring des Nibelungen performed over the course of one week by the Staatskapelle Berlin, conducted by Daniel Barenboim, the first time the complete Ring cycle had been performed at the Proms in a single season.  BBC Radio 3 also collaborated with BBC Radio 2 and Radio 6.

In 2013 Marin Alsop became the first female conductor of the Last Night of the Proms.

2014 
The 2014 season had a number of pieces in commemoration of the 100th anniversary of the outbreak of World War I, including the premiere of the violin concerto "1914" by Gabriel Prokofiev and "Requiem Fragments" by John Tavener. Also performed were "War Elegy" by Ivor Gurney, and Benjamin Britten's "War Requiem".

There were special proms for younger children (The Cbeebies prom), a staging of Kiss Me, Kate, and a concert inspired by the World War I-era War Horse, featuring puppets from the play. The late night proms season included performances by the Pet Shop Boys and Paloma Faith.

Composers having special attention included Sir Harrison Birtwistle, Sir Peter Maxwell Davies (both celebrating their 80th birthdays in 2014), William Walton, and Richard Strauss.

2015
Themes for the 2015 season included works by Carl Nielsen and Jean Sibelius, in commemoration of the 150th anniversaries of each composer.

The Late Night Proms included collaborations with BBC Asian Network (Prom 8), Radio 1 (Prom 16, featuring dance music hits from the past 20 years), Radio 6 Music (Prom 27) and Radio 1Xtra (Prom 37, which featured grime artists Stormzy, Wretch 32, Little Simz and others).

2016 

The 2016 Proms season featured a new series of 'Proms at...' concerts which included performances at venues in London besides the Royal Albert Hall and Cadogan Hall, specifically:
 The Chapel, Old Royal Naval College, Greenwich
 Sam Wanamaker Playhouse, Shakespeare's Globe 
 The Roundhouse, Camden
 Bold Tendencies Multi-Storey Car Park, Peckham
These concerts were offered in place of the previous Saturday Matinee concerts at Cadogan Hall.

2016 marked David Pickard's first season as Director, BBC Proms. This marked the first time since the 1990s when the posts of Controller, BBC Radio 3 and Director, BBC Proms were not combined.

2017 
The 2017 Proms season featured a number of composer anniversaries:
John Adams: 70th birthday
 Philip Glass: 80th birthday
 John Williams: 85th birthday
The season also continued the 'Proms at...' series, with the following concerts:
 Stage@TheDock, Hull (the first Prom to be given outside of the London metropolitan area since 1930)
 Southwark Cathedral
 Bold Tendencies Multi-Storey Car Park, Peckham
 Wilton's Music Hall
 The Tanks at Tate Modern

In addition, Xian Zhang became the first female conductor ever to conduct the annual Prom which includes the Symphony No. 9 of Beethoven, on 30 July 2017.  The 2017 Proms season featured 7 female conductors, the greatest number of female conductors in a single Proms season to that point.

2018 
The 2018 season ran from 13 July to 8 September and featured a number of composer anniversaries:
 Leonard Bernstein: 100th anniversary of his birth
 Lili Boulanger: 100th anniversary of her death
 Claude Debussy: 100th anniversary of his death
 Hubert Parry: 100th anniversary of his death

Women composers were also celebrated on the 100th anniversary of the extension of voting rights to some women in the UK.  The 22 composers featured included Clara Schumann, Ethel Smyth, Amy Beach, Alma Mahler, Florence Price and Thea Musgrave.

Prom 3, on 15 July, marked the fortieth anniversary of the BBC Young Musician competition and featured performances from a number of the competition's previous and current winners and finalists.

2019 
The 2019 season ran from 19 July to 14 September.

2020 
The 2020 season marked 125 years since the first Proms season and was reimagined due to the COVID-19 pandemic, running from 19 July to 12 September. It featured "a unique format to reflect the times, with a compelling multi-platform offer".

2021
The 2021 season ran from 30 July to 11 September. This year marked 150 years of the Royal Albert Hall.

Composers commissioned for the season were James MacMillan, Elizabeth Ogonek, Augusta Read Thomas, Britta Byström, Shiva Feshareki, Nico Muhly, George Lewis, George Benjamin, Grace-Evangeline Mason and Gity Razaz.

2022
The 2022 season ran from 15 July to 8 September. This year marked the 100th anniversary of the BBC and for the first time, the festival used the new BBC logo as part of the wider corporate rebrand on 20 October 2021. 

Due to the death of Elizabeth II, the 2022 season ended on 8 September without the Last Night of the Proms.

Last Night of the Proms
 
Many people's perception of the Proms is based on the Last Night, although this is very different from the other concerts. It usually takes place on the second Saturday in September, and is broadcast in the UK on BBC Radio 3, and on television on BBC Two (first half) and BBC One (second half).  The concert is traditionally in a lighter, 'winding-down' vein, with popular classics followed by a second half of British patriotic pieces. This sequence traditionally includes Edward Elgar's "Pomp & Circumstance March No. 1" (to part of which "Land of Hope and Glory" is sung) and Henry Wood's "Fantasia on British Sea Songs", followed by Thomas Arne's "Rule, Britannia!". The concert concludes with Hubert Parry's "Jerusalem", and the British national anthem, since 2010 in an arrangement by Benjamin Britten. The repeat of the Elgar march at the Last Night can be traced to the spontaneous audience demand for a double encore after its premiere at a 1901 Proms concert. The closing sequence of the second half became fully established in 1954 during Sargent's tenure as chief conductor. The Prommers have made a tradition of singing "Auld Lang Syne" after the end of the concert, but this was not included in the programme until 2015. However, when James Loughran, a Scot, conducted the Last Night concert in the late 1970s and early 1980s he did include the piece within the programme.

Tickets are highly sought after. Promming tickets are priced the same as for that season's concerts, but seated tickets are more expensive. To pre-book a seat, it is necessary to have bought tickets for at least five other concerts in the season and an advance booking for the Last Night must include those five concerts; the seat for the Last Night cannot be a better one (in terms of its pricing) than those for the other concerts.   After the advance booking period, there is no requirement to have booked for additional concerts, but by then the Last Night is usually sold out, although returns may be available.  For standing places, a full season pass automatically includes admission to the Last Night; day Prommers must present five ticket stubs from previous concerts to qualify for a standing Last Night ticket, either in the Arena or Gallery (prior to 2009, the requirement was for six other concerts).

 some Arena standing tickets have been available for purchase on the day, with no requirement to have attended previous concerts. These are sold on a 'first-come first-served' basis to those prepared to queue. In the post-war period, with the growing popularity of the Last Night, the only way to obtain tickets was through a postal ballot held well in advance.  An annual ballot now exists for the chance to purchase a maximum of two tickets from a special allocation of 100 stalls seats.

Prommers with tickets are likely to queue up much earlier than usual (many overnight, and in past years, some slept outside the hall for up to three weeks to guard their place – although this is no longer permitted) to ensure a good place to stand; the resulting camaraderie adds to the atmosphere. Some attend in fancy dress, from dinner jackets to patriotic T-shirts. Many use the occasion for an exuberant display of Britishness. Union Flags are waved by the Prommers, especially during "Rule, Britannia!". Other national flags, balloons and party poppers are all welcomed – although John Drummond discouraged 'extraneous noise' during his tenure as director.

Sir Henry Wood's bust is adorned with a laurel chaplet by representatives of the Promenaders, who often wipe an imaginary bead of sweat from his forehead or make some similar gentle visual joke.  As with the rest of the season, the cost of promming tickets (standing tickets) is just £6. Many consider these to be the best tickets due to the atmosphere of standing in the hall for up to three hours, albeit with a twenty-five minute interval.

Another tradition is that near the end of the concert the conductor makes a speech thanking the musicians and audiences, mentioning the main themes of the season, noting the cumulative donation collected for the Promenaders' musical charities over the season, and announcing the date of the First Night for the following year.  This tradition dates from 1941, when Sir Henry Wood gave the first such speech at the close of that season, which was the first at the Royal Albert Hall, when he thanked colleagues and sponsors.  Wood gave a similar speech at the 1942 Last Night, and a pre-recorded version was played at the 1943 Last Night.  During his tenure as conductor, Sir Malcolm Sargent established the tone of making the Last Night speech more humorous.  Subsequent conductors have generally continued this, although one exception was in 1997 when Sir Andrew Davis addressed the deaths of Diana, Princess of Wales, Mother Teresa, and Sir Georg Solti in 1997.

Leonard Slatkin, chief conductor of the BBC Symphony Orchestra from 2000 to 2004, expressed a desire to tone down the nationalism of the Last Night, and during the seasons from 2002 until 2007 "Rule Britannia" was only heard as part of Henry Wood's '"Fantasia on British Sea Songs" (another piece traditional to the Last Night) rather than separately. Slatkin, an American and the first non-Commonwealth citizen to lead the Last Night, conducted his first in 2001, just days after the 9/11 attacks.  The atmosphere was more restrained and less festive than normal, with a heavily revised programme where the finale of Beethoven's 9th Symphony replaced the "Sea Songs", and Samuel Barber's "Adagio for Strings" was performed in tribute to 9/11 victims.

On the day of the 2005 Last Night, the hall management received word of a bomb threat, which led to a thorough search of the Albert Hall for 5 hours, but the concert took place after a short delay.  This has led to increased security concerns, given the stature of the Last Night in British culture, which Jacqui Kelly of the Royal Albert Hall staff noted:

2008 also contained some departures from the traditional programme. "Pomp and Circumstance March No. 1" was moved to after the conductor's speech. In addition, most of Wood's "Fantasia on British Sea Songs" was replaced by Vaughan Williams's Sea Songs as a final tribute in his anniversary year.  However, Wood's arrangements of naval bugle calls from the start of the "Fantasia" were retained, and Sargent's arrangement of "Rule Britannia" returned with Bryn Terfel as soloist.  As on his 1994 Last Night appearance, he sang one verse in a Welsh translation, with the chorus also translated into Welsh. Additionally, 2008 saw the inclusion of Scottish composer Anna Meredith to the programme for her Proms premiere, froms, which involved five different groups of musicians telecasting in from around Britain.

2009 saw the continued absence of Wood's Sea Songs, this time replaced by specially commissioned fanfares, and extracts from Handel's "Music for the Royal Fireworks". In 2009, for the first time, the Last Night was shown live in several cinemas across Asia and in Canada and Australia.

The 2014 Last Night saw soprano Elizabeth Watts wearing a dress by Vivienne Westwood, which was auctioned in aid of Streetwise Opera. The online auction ran from 8 September to 18 September.

In 2016, anti-Brexit protestors waved EU flags in addition to the usual Union Jack flags. The protests have continued in subsequent years.

In 2020, the concert was performed to an empty hall, due to the COVID-19 restrictions in place in the UK.

In 2022, the concert was cancelled 48 hours before it was scheduled to happen, following the death of Queen Elizabeth II; this was the first Last Night cancellation since 1944. Dalia Stasevska had been selected to conduct. Because of the cancellation of the Last Night in 2022, no date for the First Night of the Proms for 2023 has yet been announced.

Last Night conductors
The following table lists by year the conductors of the Last Night of the Proms. In general, since the tenure of Sargent, the Chief Conductor of the BBC Symphony Orchestra has led this concert, but guest conductors have directed the Last Night on several occasions. Additionally, the tradition was for a British conductor, and if not the current serving Chief Conductor, one who had an association with the BBC Symphony Orchestra or one of the other BBC orchestras. Charles Mackerras was the first non-British-born conductor to lead the Last Night, in 1980. Leonard Slatkin was the first American conductor of the Last Night in 2001. Jiří Bělohlávek was the first non-native English speaker to conduct the Last Night, in 2007. Marin Alsop was the Last Night's first female conductor in 2013.

Proms in the Park
The Royal Albert Hall could be filled many times over with people who would wish to attend. To involve extra people, and to cater for those who are not near London, the Proms in the Park concerts were started in 1996. Initially there was one, in Hyde Park adjacent to the Hall, which was a simple video relay of the concert at the Royal Albert Hall. As audiences grew, Proms in the Park started to have musicians of their own on stage, including the BBC Concert Orchestra.

In the 2000s, Proms in the Park started to be held in other locations across the UK, usually with one of the BBC's orchestras playing. In 2005, Belfast, Glasgow, Swansea and Manchester hosted a Last Night Prom in the Park, broadcast live from each venue. In 2007 Manchester's prom was replaced by one in Middlesbrough. In 2008 the number reduced from five to four, in Hyde Park, Belfast, Glasgow and Swansea.  2009 returned to a total of five, in Hyde Park, Glasgow, Swansea, County Down and Salford. Each location has its own live concert, typically playing the national anthem of the host country, before joining in a live big screen video link up with the Royal Albert Hall for the traditional finale.

In recent years Proms in the Park has become a series of established events in their own right, with events in Hyde Park and in Scotland, Wales and Northern Ireland, managed by BBC Scotland, BBC Cymru Wales and BBC Northern Ireland respectively, in conjunction with the host local authority. Each event has a presenting team, a live orchestra, a video link to the Last Night of the Proms in London, and guest soloists and choirs. Events tend to move to different cities to cover a wider geographical area within the host nations.

All of these events are incorporated within BBC One's live coverage of the Last Night of the Proms, with live link-ups to each of the venues. However, some more traditional elements of the Last Night of the Proms (such as "Jerusalem", "Rule Britannia" and "Land of Hope and Glory") have been removed on some years depending on local politics.

As the popularity of Proms in the Park grew, many communities across the UK decided to hold their own "Proms in the Park" events that were not affiliated with the BBC.

The first live relays outside of London were to Swansea and Birmingham in 1999.

In 2001, there were also live link-ups to Cornwall and Liverpool.

In 2011, Caerphilly's Proms in the Park was cancelled before the concert started due to heavy rainfall

Proms seasons

Proms Controllers
 William Glock (1960–1973)
 Robert Ponsonby (1973–1985)
 John Drummond (1986–1995)
 Nicholas Kenyon (1996–2007)
 Roger Wright (2007–2014)
 Edward Blakeman (interim Director; 2014–2015)
 David Pickard (2015–present)

See also

 BBC Radio 2 Electric Proms
 List of music festivals in the United Kingdom

References

External links

 BBC Proms Archive
 BBC Proms reviews at musicOMH
 Detailed Concert Annals for the 1959–1961 season
 Nick Breckenfield, "The Last Night of the Proms 2007".  classicalsource.com page 
 Last night of the Proms 2016
 Official photographer to the proms for over 40 years - Chris Christodoulou

Music festivals established in 1895
1895 establishments in England
Annual events in London
Proms
British classical music radio programmes
Classical music festivals in England
Classical music in London
Concerts at the Royal Albert Hall
Music festivals in London
Recurring events established in 1895
Tourist attractions in the City of Westminster
Summer events in England